Horyniec-Zdrój  (Horynets’) is a village in Lubaczów County, Subcarpathian Voivodeship, in south-eastern Poland, about  from the border with Ukraine. It is the seat of the gmina (administrative district) called Gmina Horyniec-Zdrój. The village has a population of 2,700.

Horyniec-Zdrój is a spa village with three large sanitariums - CRR KRUS (Horyniec-Zdrój), Bajka (Horyniec-Zdrój) and Uzdrowisko Horyniec (Horyniec-Zdrój) (Sanitarium Horyniec-Zdrój). The population consists largely of farmers, owning their own small farms.

References

External links
 Local authority website (PL)
 Unofficial website (PL)

Villages in Lubaczów County
Spa towns in Poland